The Liu River (pinyin: Liǔ Jiāng, literally: Willow River) is a tributary within the Pearl River system in Guangxi, China.  It is formed by the confluence of the Rong and Long rivers in Fengshan.  It flows south through Liuzhou and then the Luoqing Jiang enters from the north.  It meets the larger Hongshui He east of Laibin where it becomes known as the Qian Jiang.

Non-native piranha were reported to have been spotted in the river at Liuzhou. However, only one has ever been found.

References 

Rivers of Guangxi
Tributaries of the Pearl River (China)